The 2006 Maldives FA Cup, was the 19th edition of the Maldives FA Cup.

Qualifying rounds

First round

Second round

Third Round

Quarter-finals

Semi-finals

Third place play-off

Final

References

 Maldives FA Cup 2006 at rsssf.com

External links
 Maldives FA Cup Official page at Facebook

Maldives FA Cup seasons
FA Cup